The 2012 Essendon Football Club season is the club's 114th season in the Australian Football League (AFL).

After a promising start to the season Essendon found themselves second on the ladder with a record of 8 wins and 1 loss (which was by a single point). The season then took an unexpected turn which saw Essendon lose 10 out of the last 13 games and miss the finals. They became the first club to have an 8–1 record and miss finals since Melbourne in the 1971 season.

Prior to the final round vice captain Mark McVeigh announced his retirement from football after 14 season and 232 games at the club.
After the Home and Away season completed Essendon captain Jobe Watson was awarded the Brownlow Medal. The highest individual accolade in the AFL. This was later handed back following the drug scandal.

The season became notorious for the illegal supplements program that was operated by the club prior to and into the 2012 season. After a three-year investigation, thirty-four players on the 2012 squad were suspected to have been administered the banned peptide Thymosin beta-4, and were suspended for the 2016 season.

Squad

Trades

In

Out

Drafts

National Draft

Rookie Draft

Pre-Season Draft

Delisted

Guernsey

Standard

Special Versions

Heritage Guernsey
On 2 July  unveiled their Heritage Guernsey. It feature all the names of past premiership players in the background along with the name and signature of club legend John Colman on the breast. Under the signature include the traditional Essendon Football Club motto 'suaviter in modo, fortiter in re' which dates back to the 1870s and translates as 'gentle in manner, resolute in deed.' The most notable change to the guernsey was the removal of the black background to comply with AFL rules requiring each club to provide a clash guernsey.
This marked the end of a 114-year-long tradition as the first time the Essendon Football Club would play an AFL/VFL game without wearing its famous black and red stripe guernsey.

Results

Pre-season (NAB Cup)

Round 1

 The three teams in each pool play each other in games of two 20-minute halves, with all three games being played over a three-hour period at the one venue.

Round 2

Round 3

Round 4 - NAB Challenge Round

Home and Away season

Round 1

Round 2

Round 3

Round 4

Round 5

Round 6

Round 7

Round 8

Round 9

Round 10

Round 11

Round 12
Bye

Round 13

Round 14

Round 15

Round 16

Round 17

Round 18

Round 19

Round 20

Round 21

Round 22

Round 23

Ladder

Ladder progress

Tribunal cases

Season statistics

Home attendance

Awards

2012 Brownlow Medal

Crichton Medal

Other Awards

Season Financials

EFC Annual Report 2012

Notes
 "Points" refers to carry-over points accrued following the sanction. For example, 154.69 points draw a one-match suspension, with 54.69 carry-over points (for every 100 points, a one-match suspension is given).
 Denotes amount of seasons on the  list only.

References

External links
 Official website of the Essendon Football Club
 Official website of the Australian Football League 
 2012 Season scores and results at AFL Tables
 2012 Essendon player statistics at AFL Tables

2012
Essendon Football Club